Peter Velits (born 21 February 1985 in Bratislava) is a Slovakian former professional road racing cyclist. His career highlights included third place overall and a stage win at the 2010 Vuelta a España, the 2007 World Under-23 Road Race Championships gold and the 2012 Tour of Oman overall victory. His twin brother, Martin Velits also competed professionally, having raced on the same teams every year until the end of the 2013 season.

He remained with the team until he retired at the end of the 2016 season.

Major results

2003
 National Junior Road Championships
1st  Road race
1st  Time trial
2004
 7th Overall Tour d'Egypte
 10th Overall UAE Emirates Post Tour
 10th Grand Prix Bradlo
2005
 1st  Time trial, National Under-23 Road Championships
 1st Stage 6 Vuelta a Navarra
 3rd Overall Giro delle Regioni
 6th Overall Ringerike GP
2006
 1st  Time trial, National Under-23 Road Championships
 1st Overall Giro del Capo
1st Stage 2
 1st Grand Prix Kooperativa
 2nd Overall Grand Prix Guillaume Tell
1st Stage 2
 4th Overall Tour de Bretagne
 4th Grote Prijs Stad Zottegem
 5th Overall Tour de la Somme
 9th Overall Tour of Japan
2007
 1st  Road race, UCI Under-23 Road World Championships
 1st Grand Prix de Fourmies
 3rd GP Triberg-Schwarzwald
 9th Overall Bayern Rundfahrt
1st Young rider classification
 9th Overall Giro del Capo
2008
  Combativity award Stage 17 Tour de France
2009
 1st Grand Prix of Aargau Canton
 3rd Clásica de San Sebastián
 5th Gran Premio di Lugano
 6th Prague–Karlovy Vary–Prague
 7th Monte Paschi Strade Bianche
 8th GP Triberg-Schwarzwald
 10th Milan–San Remo
2010
 3rd Overall Vuelta a España
1st Stages 1 (TTT) & 17 (ITT)
 10th Overall Volta ao Algarve
2012
 1st  Team time trial, UCI Road World Championships
 National Road Championships
1st  Time trial
2nd Road race
 1st  Overall Tour of Oman
2013
 1st  Team time trial, UCI Road World Championships
 1st  Time trial, National Road Championships
 10th Overall Paris–Nice
2014
 1st  Team time trial, UCI Road World Championships
 National Road Championships
1st  Time trial
2nd Road race
 9th Overall Dubai Tour
 9th Overall Paris–Nice
2015
 Vuelta a España
1st Stage 1 (TTT)
Held  after Stage 1

Grand Tour general classification results timeline

Did not finish = DNF

References

External links

Palmares on Cycling Base (French)

Slovak male cyclists
1985 births
Living people
Slovakian Vuelta a España stage winners
Sportspeople from Bratislava
Slovak twins
Twin sportspeople
UCI Road World Champions (elite men)